Khoj, The Search is a 2010 Bangladeshi Bengali romantic action film starring Ananta, Bobby, Afiea Nusrat Barsha and Sohel Rana.

Plot
The film features Major Mahmud/Ananta (M A Jalil), a secret service agent working for Bangladesh Counter Intelligence (BCI), a fictional agency conceived in the Masud Rana series by Qazi Anwar Hussain. With the help of Captain Bobby, Major Mahmud thwarts the international arms syndicate headed by the notorious villain Nino.

Cast
 M.A. Jalil Ananta as Major Mahmud / Ananta
 Bobby as Captain Bobby
 Afiea Nusrat Barsha as Elisa
 Nino – Arms smuggler
 Sohel Rana as Chief of Command
 Jisan as Pabel
 Dr.Ezazul Islam as Master
 Apu as 50/50
 Iftakar Chowdhury as Major Kamrul
 Jessica Hass as L.A. spy
 Mick Bosh as Las Vegas villain
 Raha as Nino's girlfriend
 Elias Kobra as martial arts villan
 Nino as arms smuggler Nino
 M. A. Jisan as maid of Jalil
 Lal Roni as Sajid

Soundtrack

Reception and box office
Monsoon Films, a leading distributor in Dhaka, confirmed that the film opened across 44 cinemas all over Bangladesh. The movie was acclaimed for its overall picture quality and the use of elaborate visual effects in the action scenes. Before the release, the movie drew a huge amount of public attention by a massive promotional campaign in the national and international media. The trailer and pre-released item numbers went viral via Facebook and YouTube, and became the first internet meme in Bangladesh. The producer and lead actor, M A Jalil has announced that the film will be followed up with a sequel. Shahidul Islam Khokon, a commercially successful Dhallywood filmmaker, has been contracted for the next installment of the film  The film became a hit due to the flaws in the film, which gave it an unintentional humor appeal, to the mostly young viewers.

References

External links
 

2010 films
2010 action films
Bengali-language Bangladeshi films
Bangladeshi action films
2010s Bengali-language films
Monsoon Films films